Hamlet is both a masculine given name and a surname. Derivative versions of the name are Gamlet, Hamnet in English, and Hamelin in French.

Notable people with the name include:

Given name
Hamlet Barrientos (born 1978), Bolivian footballer
Hamlet Gonashvili (1928–1985), Georgian singer
Hamlet Handley, English footballer
Hamlet Isakhanli (born 1948), Azerbaijani mathematician and writer
Hamlet Mkhitaryan (footballer, born 1973), Armenian footballer
Hamlet Mkhitaryan (footballer, born 1962), Armenian Soviet footballer
Hamlet Watling (1818–1908), English antiquarian
Hamlet Winstanley (1698–1756), English painter and engraver
Gamlet Siukayev , (born 1981), Russian footballer

Surname
Douglas Hamlet (died 1995), Saint Vincent and the Grenadines murderer
Harry G. Hamlet (1874–1954), Commandant of the United States Coast Guard
Norm Hamlet, American guitarist

Fictional characters
Prince Hamlet, title character and protagonist of the William Shakespeare tragedy of the same name

References

Masculine given names